Alexander McQueen: Savage Beauty was an art exhibition held in 2011 at the Metropolitan Museum of Art featuring clothing created by British fashion designer Alexander McQueen, as well as accessories created for his runway shows. The exhibit was extremely popular in New York City and resulted in what was then record attendance for the museum.  The curators were Andrew Bolton and Harold Koda.

The show opened on May 4, a little more than one year after McQueen's death, and closed on August 7. Savage Beauty was shown again at the Victoria and Albert Museum in London from March 14, 2015 to August 2, 2015, but with additional items of exhibits.

Contents

The exhibit was organized by the museum's Anna Wintour Costume Center and curated by Andrew Bolton and Harold Koda. The exhibit featured McQueen's pieces from the archives of his own London fashion house, Alexander McQueen and of the Parisian couture house Givenchy, as well as pieces held in private collections. The show is composed of six separate galleries, arranged by theme: "The Romantic Mind", featuring some of his oldest work in the early 1990s; "Romantic Gothic and the Cabinet of Curiosities", featuring his exploration of Victorian Gothic themes; "Romantic Nationalism", examining Scottish and British identity; "Romantic Exoticism", examining non-western influences in his designs; "Romantic Primitivism", featuring natural materials and organic designs; and "Romantic Naturalism", featuring his attempts to integrate themes of the natural world with technology. 

The exhibit includes pieces from his first major collection, Jack the Ripper Stalks His Victims, created during his graduate studies at Central Saint Martins College of Art and Design.  Other collections included in the exhibit were Dante, It's a Jungle out There, #13, VOSS, Irere, and Plato's Atlantis, as well as Banshee, Highland Rape, The Widows of Culloden (including the original life-size hologram of Kate Moss), and Horn of Plenty. Also included in the exhibition are works by McQueen's collaborators such as the milliner Philip Treacy and jeweler Shaun Leane who produced designs used in his runway shows.

Reception

The exhibit was widely praised by critics in the international press. Hilary Alexander of The Daily Telegraph called it "an absorbing, astounding walk through the extraordinary convolutions of his mind, and the technical virtuosity he could summon up in order to turn his ideas and thoughts into reality". Holland Cotter of The New York Times wrote that the show "is a button-pushing marvel: ethereal and gross, graceful and utterly manipulative, and poised on a line where fashion turns into something else", but also noted that the exhibit steers clear of addressing questions about the contradictions in his work. Suzy Menkes of The International Herald Tribune also had some issues with the presentation, "Mr. Bolton might have discussed the designer’s place in the British art scene, alongside the Chapman brothers, or compared his fascination with nature’s decadence with that of Damien Hirst. Instead, we get Sarah Jessica Parker’s breathless and witless take on the McQueen style." Overall, though, she said the exhibit "is exciting, stimulating and thought-provoking – and a raw vision of the wild McQueen imagination." Judith Thurman of The New Yorker advised that "even if you never bother with fashion shows, go to this one. Andrew Bolton ... has assembled a hundred ensembles and seventy accessories ... and he gives their history and psychology an astute reading." 

The show was also extremely popular with the public, leading the museum to take extraordinary measures to meet demand. Originally scheduled to run only until July 31 that year, it was extended through August 7. Patrons waited in lines of up to two hours to see the exhibit. To accommodate the large crowds, the Met offered a special $50 ticket to view the exhibit on Mondays, when the museum was usually closed. Over 17,000 of these tickets were sold. The Met also allowed its members to skip the line; museum membership increased 15%, with 20,000 new memberships sold during the show. During the final weekend of the exhibition, lines stretched to over four hours, and the museum stayed open until midnight for the first time in its history. By the time the exhibit closed, over 650,000 people had seen it, making it one of the most popular exhibits in the museum's history, and its most popular fashion exhibit ever.

Subsequent showings

From March 14, 2015 to August 2, 2015, the exhibition was housed in the Victoria and Albert Museum, where it was similarly well-received. The core of the exhibition remained the same as the one in the Metropolitan Museum, but 66 additional items of clothing and accessories were added, including rare early works by McQueen. A new section was added focusing on pieces from his early career. The exhibition was the largest collection of works by McQueen and his collaborators ever assembled. Ticket sales exceeding 480,000 prompted museum management to implement overnight hours during the show’s final two weekends in order to meet demand. This was the first time the museum had ever extended its hours this way to accommodate interest in an exhibition.

Gallery
Alexander McQueen’s fascination with the elemental—earth, wind, fire and water—imbued his collections with primordial drama. Nature and its materials were a constant in McQueen’s work.  Each piece was made from unique materials, which suits each items. McQueen did not use any leather; he used recycled and natural materials to substitute the collection as up-cycled. For example, some materials he usually uses in his work are hair, wood, taxidermy, horns, and coral. In addition, he also referenced reptile skin and blood onto his work as well. Cotton used in McQueen's pieces to represent a natural product because of the way it is designed.

References

External links
 
 Victoria & Albert Museum Savage Beauty page

Metropolitan Museum of Art exhibitions
2011 in art
Fashion exhibitions
Alexander McQueen